Monty Python's Flying Circus: The Computer Game (referred to simply as Monty Python's Flying Circus in the game itself) is a 1990 scrolling shoot 'em up video game  developed by Core Design. It was released by Virgin Games the Amiga, Commodore 64, Amstrad CPC, and the ZX Spectrum. It is loosely based on material and characters from the 1970s British comedy series Monty Python's Flying Circus, in particular the Gumby character.

Reception
Contemporary reviews of the game were mixed, ranging from relatively high (89% for the Atari ST reissue from Zero magazine) to poor (47% for the Commodore 64 version from Zzap 64).

Gallery

References

External links
Monty Python's Flying Circus at MobyGames

1990 video games
Amiga games
Amstrad CPC games
Atari ST games
Commodore 64 games
Core Design games
Monty Python video games
Parody video games
Shoot 'em ups
Single-player video games
Video games based on television series
Virgin Interactive games
ZX Spectrum games
Video games developed in the United Kingdom